A landscape architect is a person who is educated in the field of landscape architecture. The practice of landscape architecture includes: site analysis, site inventory, site planning, land planning, planting design, grading, storm water management, sustainable design, construction specification, and ensuring that all plans meet the current building codes and local and federal ordinances. 

The practice of landscape architecture dates to some of the earliest of human cultures and just as much as the practice of medicine has been inimical to the species and ubiquitous worldwide for several millennia. However, this article examines the modern profession and educational discipline of those practicing the design of landscape architecture. 

In the 1700s, Humphry Repton described his occupation as "landscape gardener" on business cards he had prepared to represent him in work that now would be described as that of a landscape architect. 

The title, "landscape architect", was first used by Frederick Law Olmsted, the designer of New York City's Central Park in Manhattan and numerous projects of large scale both public and private. He was the founder of a firm of landscape architects who employed highly skilled professionals to design and execute aspects of projects designed under his auspices.

Depending on the jurisdiction, landscape architects who pass state requirements to become registered, licensed, or certified may be entitled to use the postnominal letters RLA, LLA, or CLA, respectively. In the US, all 50 states have adopted licensure. The American Society of Landscape Architects endorses the postnominal letters PLA, for Professional Landscape Architect.

Australia
The Australian Institute of Landscape Architects (AILA) states that "Landscape Architects research, plan, design, and advise on the stewardship, conservation, and sustainability of development of the environment and spaces, both within and beyond the built environment". This definition of the profession of landscape architect is based on the International Standard Classification of Occupations, International Labour Office, Geneva.

Some notable Australian landscape architects include Catherin Bull, Kevin Taylor, Richard Weller, Peter Spooner, Doris Brown, Grace Fraser, Bruce Mackenzie, Mary Jeavons, Janet Conrad, Dr Jim Sinatra, William Guilfoyle, Ina Higgins, Edna Walling, and Ellis Stones.

To become a recognised professional landscape architect in Australia, the first requirement is to obtain a degree in landscape architecture accredited by the Australian Institute of Landscape Architects. After at least two years of recognised professional practice, graduates may submit for further assessment to obtain full professional recognition by AILA.

Canada
The Canadian Society of Landscape Architects (CSLA) is the country's professional association of landscape architects. Some notable Canadian landscape architects include Cornelia Oberlander, Claude Cormier, Peter Jacobs, Janet Rosenberg, Marc Ryan, and Michael Hough.

United Kingdom
The Landscape Institute is the recognised body relating to the field of Landscape Architecture throughout the United Kingdom. To become a recognised landscape architect in the UK takes approximately seven years. To begin the process, one has to study an accredited course by the Landscape Institute to obtain a bachelor's degree in landscape architecture or a similar field. Following this one must progress onto a postgraduate diploma in the field of landscape architecture covering the subject in far greater detail such as mass urban planning, construction, and planting. Following this, the trainee must complete the Pathway to Chartership, a challenging but very rewarding program set out by the Landscape Institute. Following this, one is awarded a full landscape architect title and membership among the Chartered Members of the Landscape Institute (CMLI).

United States

The United States is the founding country of the formal profession entitled landscape architecture. Those in this field work both to create an aesthetically pleasing setting and also to protect and preserve the environment in an area. In the U.S., a need to formalize the practice and a name for the profession was resolved in 1899 with the formation of the American Society of Landscape Architects. A few of the many talented and influential landscape architects who have been based in the United States are: Frederick Law Olmsted, Beatrix Farrand, Jens Jensen, Ian McHarg, Thomas Church, Arthur Shurtleff, John Nolen, Lawrence Halprin, Iris Miller, and Robert Royston. 

Royston summed up one American theme:
Landscape architecture practices the fine art of relating the structure of culture to the nature of landscape, to the end that people can use it, enjoy it, and preserve it.

Work scope

The following is an outline of the typical scope of service for a landscape architect:

 
 Developing new or improved theories, policy, and methods for landscape planning, design, and management at local, regional, national, and multinational levels 
 Developing policies and plans and implementing and monitoring proposals for conservation and recreation areas such as national parks 
 Developing new or improved theories and methods to promote environmental awareness and undertaking planning, design, restoration, management, and maintenance of cultural and historic landscapes, parks, sites, and gardens.
 Planning, design, management, maintenance, and monitoring functional and aesthetic layouts of built environment in urban, suburban, and rural areas including private and public open spaces, parks, gardens, streetscapes, plazas, housing developments, burial grounds, memorials; tourist, commercial, industrial and educational complexes; sports grounds, zoos, botanic gardens, recreation areas, and farms 
 Contributing to the planning, aesthetic and functional design, location, management, and maintenance of infrastructure such as roads, dams, wind farms, and other energy and major development projects 
 Undertaking landscape assessments including environmental and visual impact assessments to prepare policies or inform new developments 
 Inspecting sites, analyzing factors such as climate, soil, flora, fauna, surface and subsurface water and drainage; and consulting with clients and making recommendations regarding methods of work and sequences of operations for projects related to the landscape and built environment 
 Identifying and developing appropriate solutions regarding the quality and use of the built environment in urban, suburban, and rural areas and making designs, plans, and working drawings, specifications of work, cost estimates, and time schedules 
 Monitoring the realisation and inspecting the construction of proposals to ensure compliance with plans, specifications of work, cost estimates, and time schedules 
 Conducting research, preparing scientific papers, and technical reports, developing policy, teaching, and advising on aspects regarding landscape architecture such as the application of geographic information systems, remote sensing, law, landscape communication, interpretation, and landscape ecology 
 Project management of large scale landscape planning and design projects including management of other consultants such as engineers, architects, and planners 
 Acting as an expert witness in development and environment courts

Further reading
 What is Landscape Architecture American Society of Landscape Architects profiles landscape architecture
 Exploring Landscape Architecture Interviews with Australian landscape architects discussing their work 
 AILA Celebrates 50 Years. History of landscape architecture in Australia
 Kerb 15. Landscape Urbanism. Launched by Charles Waldheim, April 2007. Content includes articles and interviews from Charles Waldheim, Mohsen Mostafavi, Alejandro Zaera-Polo (FOA), Kathryn Gustafson, Bart Brands, and Richard Weller

See also
 Landscaping
 Landscape contracting
 Landscape design
 Landscape design software
 List of landscape architects

References

External links

 Job Description at the U.S. Department of Labor

 
Architecture occupations

it:Architettura paesaggistica